Pretty Brown (Hangul: 프리티브라운) is a South Korean duo under Rooftop Company.  They debuted on March 20, 2015 with the single "Break Up With Break Up". They released their first album, Episode 1, on March 19, 2017.

Discography

Studio albums

Charted singles

Soundtrack appearances

References

Musical groups from Seoul
Musical groups established in 2015
2015 establishments in South Korea
South Korean musical duos
Brand New Music artists